is a former Japanese football player.

Club career
Nagira was born in Izumo on October 17, 1985. After graduating from high school, he joined Avispa Fukuoka in 2004. He debuted in 2005 and his opportunity to play increased year by year. He moved to FC Tokyo in 2011. However he could hardly play in the match and he moved to Gainare Tottori in 2012. In 2013, although he played as regular player, he retired end of 2013 season.

National team career
In June 2005, Nagira was selected Japan U-20 national team for 2005 World Youth Championship. At this tournament, he played full time in all 4 matches as center back.

Club statistics

References

External links

1985 births
Living people
Association football people from Shimane Prefecture
Japanese footballers
Japan youth international footballers
J1 League players
J2 League players
Avispa Fukuoka players
FC Tokyo players
Gainare Tottori players
Association football defenders